Gyöngyi Dani (born 3 July 1975) is a Hungarian wheelchair fencer who has won silver medals at several Paralympic Games. She was Hungary's flag bearer during the opening ceremony of the postponed 2020 Summer Paralympics in Tokyo. She returned with a bronze medal.

Life
Dani was born in Kaposvár in 1975. She had an accident when she was 16 that left her with spinal injuries. She took up sport in order to meet people.

She was at the 2008 Paralympics as part of Hungary's fencing team competing in the Women's épée and foil.

She beat the UK athlete Justine Moore in the women's individual Épée Category B before she took the silver medal. The match was at the  Excel Arena in London.

She was Hungary's flag bearer during the opening ceremony of the postponed 2020 Summer Paralympics in Tokyo. She was part of Hungary's team with Éva Hajmási and Zsuzsanna Krajnyák and they achieved the bronze medal position in the women's team foil gold. The silver and gold medals were taken by Italy and China respectively.

In January 2022 the wheelchair fencing team of Dani, Zsuzsanna Krajnyák, Dr. Boglárka Mező Madarászné and Éva Hajmási were Hungary's "best disabled team of the year".

Private life
Dani is married to Balázs Nagy and has a son named Kristóf. She lives in Érd.

References

1975 births
Living people
People from Kaposvár
Paralympic wheelchair fencers of Hungary
Hungarian female épée fencers
Wheelchair fencers at the 2004 Summer Paralympics
Wheelchair fencers at the 2008 Summer Paralympics
Wheelchair fencers at the 2012 Summer Paralympics
Wheelchair fencers at the 2016 Summer Paralympics
Wheelchair fencers at the 2020 Summer Paralympics
Medalists at the 2004 Summer Paralympics
Medalists at the 2012 Summer Paralympics
Medalists at the 2016 Summer Paralympics
Medalists at the 2020 Summer Paralympics
Hungarian female foil fencers
Sportspeople from Somogy County
21st-century Hungarian women